Joseph Patrice M'Bock (born 20 April 1983) is a former Cameroonian footballer.

M'Bock was born in Edéa. For FC Superfund, M'Bock made 16 appearances in the Austrian Football Bundesliga and played in both legs of the 2005–06 UEFA Cup qualifying rounds.

Career statistics

References 
 

1983 births
Living people
Cameroonian footballers
Association football defenders
Austrian Football Bundesliga players
AJ Auxerre players
FC Bayern Munich II players
FC Juniors OÖ players
Cameroonian expatriate footballers